Thoth is an ancient Egyptian deity.

Thoth may also refer to:

Arts and entertainment
 Thoth (film), a 2001 documentary
 Thoth (video game), 2016
 Thoth, a Goa'uld character in Stargate

Other uses
 Thout or Thoth, the first month of the ancient Egyptian and Coptic calendars
 Thoth tarot deck, painted by Lady Frieda Harris according to instructions from Aleister Crowley
 S. K. Thoth (born c. 1956), or often just Thoth, American entertainer
 Thoth (operating system), developed at the University of Waterloo

See also
 
 Jex Thoth, a band
 Society of Thoth, an undergraduate secret society at the University of British Columbia
 The Ring of Thoth a story by Arthur Conan Doyle